Flesh and Blood is a British television thriller in  four episodes that first aired on ITV in the UK in February 2020.
The first season aired in the UK in February 2020 with an ensemble cast starring  Imelda Staunton (playing Mary), Francesca Annis (playing Vivien), Stephen Rea (playing Mark), Russell Tovey (playing Jake), and Claudie Blakley (playing Helen), written by  Sarah Williams and directed by Louise Hooper.

Filming took place in the coastal village of Pevensey Bay, near Eastbourne in England.

References

External links

2020 British television series debuts
2020 British television series endings
ITV television dramas
2020s British crime drama television series
2020s British television miniseries
Television series by ITV Studios
English-language television shows
Serial drama television series